The SilencerCo Maxim 50 is a muzzle-loading rifle that includes an integrated sound suppressor. A copy of the  Traditions Vortek Strikerfire, the muzzleloader has a SilencerCo suppressor welded onto the end of the barrel.  Because the rifle is a muzzleloader, it is not considered a firearm under the Gun Control Act of 1968.  Therefore, the integrated suppressor is exempt from the National Firearms Act in the United States, because it is permanently attached to the rifle. When fired, the rifle has a report of 139.9 decibels.

References

Muzzleloaders
12.7 mm firearms